Sergey Belyayev (Серге́й Беля́ев; 8 May 1960 – 6 September 2020) was a Kazakhstani shooter, who won two silver medals in 50 metre rifle at the 1996 Summer Olympics in Atlanta. He was born in Tashkent, Uzbek SSR.

External links
 
 sports-reference

1960 births
2020 deaths
Kazakhstani male sport shooters
ISSF rifle shooters
Shooters at the 1996 Summer Olympics
Olympic shooters of Kazakhstan
Olympic silver medalists for Kazakhstan
Sportspeople from Tashkent
Olympic medalists in shooting
Asian Games medalists in shooting
Shooters at the 1994 Asian Games
Shooters at the 1998 Asian Games
Shooters at the 2002 Asian Games
Shooters at the 2006 Asian Games
Medalists at the 1996 Summer Olympics
Asian Games gold medalists for Kazakhstan
Asian Games silver medalists for Kazakhstan
Asian Games bronze medalists for Kazakhstan
Medalists at the 1994 Asian Games
Medalists at the 2002 Asian Games
Medalists at the 2006 Asian Games
Kazakhstani people of Russian descent
20th-century Kazakhstani people